Chen Shu may refer to:

 Book of Chen, a historical text about the Chen dynasty, also known as Chen Shu
 Chen Shu (painter) (1660–1736), Qing dynasty painter
 Chen Shu (actress) (born 1977), Chinese singer and actress
 Chen Shu (actor) (陈述; 1920–2006), Chinese actor